Anania ocellalis is a moth in the family Crambidae. It was described by Warren in 1892. It is found in the Russian Far East and Japan.

References

Moths described in 1892
Pyraustinae
Moths of Asia
Moths of Japan